In the 2008–09 Elite One season, 14 teams competed. Tiko United won the championship.

League standings

References
Cameroon - List of final tables (RSSSF)

Cam
1
1
Elite One seasons